Gulam Ali Khatana is an Indian politician who is serving as Nominated Member of Rajya Sabha and Secretary and Spokesperson of Bharatiya Janata Party Jammu & Kashmir unit.

References 

Nominated members of the Rajya Sabha
Members of the Rajya Sabha
Rajya Sabha members from the Bharatiya Janata Party
Indian politicians
Year of birth missing (living people)
Living people